Boneh Kuh (also Romanized as Boneh Kūh; also known as Bon Kūh) is a village in Mehran Rural District, in the Central District of Bandar Lengeh County, Hormozgan Province, Iran. At the 2006 census, its population was 249, in 45 families.

References 

Populated places in Bandar Lengeh County